Utopia is a planned luxury residential ocean liner project. A formal marketing launch of the ship, reportedly costing US$1.1 billion, was expected in 2021. The ship was originally planned to launch in 2017 but lack of funding got in the way and the binding letter of intent to build Utopia was amended in 2017. The ship was to be built by Samsung Heavy Industries, one of the largest shipbuilders in the world. The Finnish engineering company Elomatic Marine is credited for the design concept of the vessel, with architectural design by Tillberg Design U.S.

The original business plan called for residences with prices from US$3.9 million to US$30 million, but as of 2018 Utopia increased its prices to $36 million.

It is one of several residence cruise ships that are under construction or planned, includingNjord,  Dark Island  and Narrative. MS The World is the only resident-owned cruise vessel currently in service as of 2022.

Amenities
The ship will also have  175-room hotel, casino, 16,000 sq ft spa, night club, and many other amenities typical of large-scale commercial ocean-cruise liners. The company recently received regulatory approval for open floor plans and open-air kitchens (a first of its kind milestone for the passenger ship industry), which allows the kitchens to resemble the open-concept kitchens in modern North American land-based homes.

Financing
The ship will be largely financed by the Frontier Group, a private equity firm with offices in Los Angeles and Washington, D.C.  Frontier will put up most of the funds to cover the US$1.1 billion in construction costs.  In 2018, Frontier reported that the financing contingencies have been removed, clearing the path for the project to continue forward.
In 2014, Utopia Residences shipbuilding contract was suspended due to insufficient funding. In 2017, a letter of intent was amended with Samsung Heavy Industries reflecting the vessel has been ordered with planned delivery and launch in 2022.

References

External links
 

Proposed ships
Ships built by Samsung Heavy Industries